Montgomery Park Race Track was an American thoroughbred racetrack in Memphis, Tennessee.

History 
The track was originally constructed in 1851 on plantation land southeast of Memphis. In 1882, Colonel Henry A. Montgomery organized the New Memphis Jockey Club, which purchased the race track and the surrounding land. The facility was named Montgomery Park at this time.

The track ran its last race meet in 1906 due to the outlawing of gambling by the Tennessee legislature. Following the closure, the track land and facilities were first leased and then purchased by the city of Memphis and incorporated into the Mid-South Fairgrounds.

Physical attributes
The track consisted of a one mile dirt oval 65 feet wide at all points.

Track Records
Track records for Montgomery Park at various distances.

References 

Horse racing venues in Tennessee
Sports venues in Memphis, Tennessee
1851 establishments in Tennessee
1906 disestablishments in Tennessee